Cynthia is an unincorporated community in Hinds County, Mississippi, United States. It is part of the Jackson Metropolitan Statistical Area.

History
Cynthia is located on the Canadian National Railway. A post office operated under the name Cynthia from 1887 to 1935.

Multiple fossils from the Eocene epoch have been discovered in clay pits in Cynthia, including a previously unknown species of Belosaepiidae (Mississaepia mississippiensis) and a species of Pterosphenus.

Notable person
 Patrick Henry, member of the United States House of Representatives from Mississippi's 7th district

References

Unincorporated communities in Hinds County, Mississippi
Unincorporated communities in Mississippi